The knowledge gap hypothesis explains that knowledge, like other forms of wealth, is often differentially distributed throughout a social system.  Specifically, the hypothesis predicts that "as the infusion of mass media information into a social system increases, segments of the population with higher  socioeconomic status tend to acquire this information at a faster rate than the lower status segments, so that the gap in knowledge between these segments tends to increase rather than decrease". Phillip J. Tichenor, then Associate Professor of Journalism and Mass Communication, George A. Donohue, Professor of Sociology, and Clarice N. Olien, Instructor in Sociology – three University of Minnesota researchers – first proposed the knowledge gap hypothesis in 1970.

Foundations

Although first formally articulated in 1970, Tichenor, Donohue, and Olien note that the knowledge gap hypothesis has been implicit throughout the mass communication literature.

Indeed, research published as early as the 1920s had already begun to examine the influence of individual characteristics on people's media content preferences.  For example, Gray and Munroe identified education – still used today as an operationalization of socioeconomic status in knowledge gap research (see, e.g., Hwang and Jeong, 2009) – as a significant and positive correlate of a person's tendency to prefer "serious" (rather than non-serious) print content.

Popular belief, however, held that such differences in preferences might be diminished by the advent of radio, which required neither the special skill nor the exertion of reading (Lazarsfeld, 1940). Guglielmo Marconi, inventor of the wireless telegraph, even believed that the radio would "make war impossible, because it will make war ridiculous" (Narodny, 1912, p. 145). Interested in whether radio had attenuated these individual differences in content preferences, Paul Lazarsfeld, head of the Office of Radio Research at Columbia University, set out to examine whether (1) the total amount of time that people listened to the radio and (2) the type of content they listened to correlated with their socioeconomic status.  Not only did Lazarsfeld's data indicate people of lower socioeconomic status tended to listen to more radio programming, but also they were simultaneously less likely to listen to "serious" radio content.  Contrary to popular belief at the time, then, the widespread adoption of the radio seems to have had little, if any, effect on a person's tendency to prefer specific types of content.

Further evidence supporting the knowledge gap hypothesis came from Star and Hughes (1950)  analysis of efforts to inform Cincinnati adults about the United Nations.  Like Gray and Munroe (1929)  and Lazarsfeld (1940)  before them, Star and Hughes found that while the campaign was successful in reaching better-educated people, those with less education virtually ignored the campaign.  Additionally, after realizing that the highly educated people reached by the campaign also tended to be more interested in the topic, Star and Hughes suggested that knowledge, education, and interest may be interdependent.

Specification

Based on observations implicit in mass communication research, Tichenor, Donohue, and Olien (1970) define the knowledge gap hypothesis as follows:
"As the infusion of mass media information into a social system increases, higher socioeconomic status segments tend to acquire this information faster than lower socioeconomic-status population segments so that the gap in knowledge between the two tends to increase rather than decrease" (Tichenor, Donohue, and Olien 1970, pp. 159-160).

Additionally, Tichenor, Donohue, and Olien suggest 5 reasons why the knowledge gap should exist:
 Communication skills: higher status people generally have more education, which improves their reading, comprehension, and memory skills;
 Stored information: higher status people are more likely to already know of topics in the news through previous media exposure or through formal education;
 Relevant social contact: higher status people generally have a broader sphere of activity, greater number of reference groups, and interpersonal contacts and are thus more likely to discuss news topics with others;
 Selective exposure: lower status people may be less interested, and therefore less likely to expose themselves to certain news topics; and
 Media target markets: media outlets cater to the tastes and interests of their audience.

Formal summary

Given the preceding information, the knowledge gap hypothesis can be expressed using the following set of related propositions:
 People in a society exhibit great psychological diversity due to their psychological makeup, learned experiences, social relationships, and social category memberships.
 Despite these differences, people with more education tend to have better developed cognitive and communication skills, broader social spheres with more and more diverse social contacts, and a greater amount of stored information than their counterparts with less education.
 People with greater education also tend to express interest in, and expose themselves to, a broader range of topics, including serious topics like public affairs, science, and health news.
 Therefore, as the infusion of mass media information into a social system increases, segments of the population with higher socioeconomic status tend to acquire this information at a faster rate than the lower status segments so that the gap in knowledge between these segments tends to increase rather than decrease.

Hypothesis operationalization and initial support
The knowledge gap hypothesis can be operationalized both for cross-sectional and time-series appropriate research.  For cross-sectional research, the knowledge gap hypothesis expects that "at any given time, there should be a higher correlation between acquisition of knowledge and education for topics highly publicized in the media than for topics less highly publicized.   Tichenor, Donohue, and Olien (1970) tested this hypothesis using an experiment in which participants were asked to read and discuss two news stories of varying publicity.  The results of the experiment support the hypothesis because correlations between education and understanding were significant for high publicity stories but not significant for low publicity stories.

For time-series research, the knowledge gap hypothesis expects that "over time, acquisition of knowledge of a heavily publicized topic will proceed at a faster rate among better educated persons than among those with less education."   Tichenor, Donohue, and Olien (1970) tested this hypothesis using public opinion surveys gathered between 1949 and 1965 measuring whether participants believed humans would reach the Moon in the foreseeable future.  During the 15-year span, belief among grade-school educated people increased only about 25 percentage points while belief among college educated people increased more than 60 percentage points, a trend consistent with the hypothesis.

Refining the hypothesis

Although by the mid-1970s extensive data supported the existence of a knowledge gap among low and high socioeconomic status individuals, Donohue, Tichenor, and Olien (1975)  sought to refine the hypothesis to determine under what conditions the knowledge gap might be attenuated or even eliminated.  To this end, they examined survey data on national and local issues from probability samples of 16 Minnesota communities gathered between 1969 and 1975.  Donohue and colleagues identified three variables that weakened the knowledge gap:
 Level of basic social concern aroused by the issue - Local issues that directly implicated the community tended to arouse greater social concern than national issues that did not implicate the community.  Local issues, then, tended to decrease the magnitude of the knowledge gap.
 Level of social conflict surrounding the issue - Up to the point at which a communication breakdown occurred, issues with more perceived conflict tended to draw more attention and, thus, decrease the magnitude of the knowledge gap.
 Level of homogeneity of the community - Because smaller, more homogeneous communities tend to exhibit less social differentiation and variety in sources of information than larger, more heterogeneous communities, homogeneous communities tended to exhibit smaller knowledge gaps than heterogeneous communities.

Narrative review and meta-analytic support

At least two narrative reviews and one meta-analysis of knowledge gap hypothesis research exist.  Gaziano conducted two narrative reviews, one of 58 articles with relevant data in 1983  and the other of 39 additional studies in 1997.  Gaziano writes, "the most consistent result is the presence of knowledge differentials, regardless of topic, methodological, or theoretical variations, study excellence, or other variables and conditions" (1997, p. 240).  Evidence from several decades, Gaziano concludes, underscores the enduring character of knowledge gaps and indicates that they transcend topics and research settings.

Because narrative reviews examine significance tests rather than effect sizes, Hwang and Jeong (2009) conducted a meta-analysis of 46 knowledge gap studies.  Consistent with Gaziano's results, however, Hwang and Jeong found constant knowledge gaps across time.

Closing the knowledge gap hypothesis with Web 2.0
In 2010 Elizabeth Corley and Dietram Scheufele conducted a study to investigate the widening knowledge gap with the example of nanotechnology. On the whole, public opinion research has shown that respondents with higher socioeconomic status (SES) acquire new information at a higher rate than low SES respondents. Their previous analyses of two large national surveys conducted in 2004 and 2007 found that respondents with at least a college degree displayed an increase in knowledge levels between 2004 and 2007 while respondents with education levels of less than a high school diploma had a significant decrease in nanotechnology knowledge levels. These results stress that the group that is most in need of help, low SES bracket, have not been helped through communication efforts and their nanotechnology knowledge levels have decreased over time.

Corley and Scheufele investigated a wide range of factors that may help to close knowledge gaps, including mass media. The researchers found that the number of days a week that respondents spent online was significantly correlated to knowledge levels about nanotechnology. Therefore, internet use helped those with less formal education to catch up to their counterparts.

The emergence of the Internet, and more specifically Web 2.0, may be playing a role in closing the knowledge gap. In fact, Corley and Scheufele explain that "the internet may finally live up to the hype … as a tool for creating a more informed citizenry by serving as a "leveler" of knowledge gaps." (2010, p. 2) This is widely due to the fact that information on Web 2.0 is written in layman's terms. The content is created by those individuals who have an understanding of the information, but who are also able to tailor the articles towards a more general audience.

Still, the knowledge gap may still exist even with the emergence of Web 2.0. The disenfranchised group, in this situation, the group with lower SES, must still be motivated to get the information to close the gap. Also, information about a given subject must be given. Without the content being provided, Web 2.0 will not be much of a help.  However, if the content is provided, Web 2.0 has allowed the readers to be more interactive and talk with others online, through discussion boards, forums and blogs. The results of the research conducted by Corley and Scheufele are a clear call to action for researchers to investigate non-traditional ways of connecting with lay audiences about emerging technologies.

Overall, studies show the introduction of Web 2.0 may help in closing the knowledge gap because the content that traditionally those with lower SES could not reach, can now be understood because it is written in layman's terms. Web 2.0 has helped because:
 The content on Web 2.0 is created by everyday people, for everyday people
 As a user, you can be interactive to find more information about a given subject (click through other links to find more information, search for theories and ideas you don't know on search engines, or read supplemented articles to get more information)

Criticism and directions for future research

 Although the majority of research supports the proposition that the higher the education, the greater the knowledge of various topics, the knowledge gap hypothesis specifies that this relationship should be moderated by the level of media publicity a given issue receives.  Few knowledge gap studies, however, treat media publicity as a variable.
 Because time-trend analyses indicate knowledge differentials fluctuate over time, most one-shot studies offer a brief and potentially misleading snapshot of knowledge gaps.
 A new, vital area for knowledge gap researchers to understand is the role of the family in socialization patterns related to learning.
 Because policy decisions have played a major role in increasing inequality, and knowledge gap research has policy implications, researchers should include more dialogue with policymakers.

Competing hypotheses 

There are now three existing competing hypotheses: 1) Media Malaise hypothesis (that predicts a general negative effect), 2) the Virtuous Circle hypothesis (that predicts a general positive effect), and 3) the Differential Effect hypothesis (that predicts a positive effect from newspapers, and a null or negative effect from television)" (Fraile, 2011).  Three types of media outlets have been used to examine the media effects on knowledge gap: 1) Television – knowledge gap between lower and higher education groups are greater among light television users compared to heavy television users (Eveland, 2000),  2) Newspaper – the exposure to newspaper can potentially reinforce the knowledge gap in politics for different SES groups since reading newspaper requires literacy ability to effectively understand the information (Jerit et al., 2006),  while other studies suggest that exposure to newspaper actually slightly decreases the knowledge gap rather than increasing it (Eveland, 2000),  and 3) Internet - internet exposure increases public's general knowledge in health issues (Shim, 2008).

See also
 Attention inequality
 Digital divide
 Knowledge divide

References

Digital divide
Hypotheses
Media studies